A number of ships have been named Sun Princess including:

  a cruise ship launched in 1972, she served under this name from 1974 until 1988
 , a cruise ship launched in 1995, she served under this name until 2020
 , a cruise ship scheduled to be launched in 2023 and commence operations in 2024

References

Ship names